Liana Milena Salazar Vergara (born 16 September 1992) is a Colombian professional footballer who last played as a midfielder for Brazilian Série A1 side Sport Club Corinthians Paulista.

Salazar played for the Colombia women's national football team at the 2012 Summer Olympics.
At college level, she played for the University of Kansas in the United States.

Football career transfers and statistics 
We are going to show you the list of football clubs and seasons in which Liana Milena Salazar Vergara has played. It includes the total number of appearance (caps), substitution details, goals, yellow and red cards stats.

Liana Milena Salazar Vergara has played in the following competitions and football tournaments.

See also
 Colombia at the 2012 Summer Olympics

References

External links
 
 

1992 births
Living people
Footballers from Bogotá
Colombian women's footballers
Women's association football midfielders
Kansas Jayhawks women's soccer players
Independiente Santa Fe (women) players
Atlético Huila (women) players
Sport Club Corinthians Paulista (women) players
Campeonato Brasileiro de Futebol Feminino Série A1 players
Colombia women's international footballers
2011 FIFA Women's World Cup players
Olympic footballers of Colombia
Footballers at the 2012 Summer Olympics
Footballers at the 2016 Summer Olympics
Colombian expatriate women's footballers
Colombian expatriate sportspeople in the United States
Expatriate women's soccer players in the United States
Colombian expatriate sportspeople in Sweden
Expatriate women's footballers in Sweden
Colombian expatriate sportspeople in China
Expatriate women's footballers in China
Colombian expatriate sportspeople in Brazil
Expatriate women's footballers in Brazil